Marina Raguš (born 8 July 1969) is a Serbian politician. She served in the National Assembly of Serbia from 2007 to 2012 as a member of the far-right Serbian Radical Party (Srpska radikalna stranka, SRS) and was re-elected to the assembly in 2020 on the electoral list of the Serbian Patriotic Alliance (Srpski patriotski savez, SPAS). In 2021, she became a member of the Serbian Progressive Party (Srpska napredna stranka, SNS).

Early life and career
Raguš was born in Belgrade, in what was then the Socialist Republic of Serbia in the Socialist Federal Republic of Yugoslavia. She has a bachelor's degree in political science and international relations. Raguš began working part-time for Studio B after her graduation; soon after this, she moved to a position in the Yugoslavian ministry of information. She has been active in a non-governmental organization called the Institute for the Research of Serbian Suffering in the Twentieth Century.

Politician

Serbian Radical Party member (1996–2012)
Raguš became active with the Radical Party in the Belgrade municipality of Voždovac in 1996. She ran for the City Assembly of Belgrade in Voždovac's tenth division in the 2000 Serbian local elections and lost to a candidate of the Democratic Opposition of Serbia (Demokratska opozicija Srbije, DOS). She later appeared in the 172nd position on the Radical Party's electoral list in the 2000 Serbian parliamentary election and was not granted a mandate when the list won twenty-three seats.. (From 2000 to 2011, Serbian parliamentary mandates were awarded to sponsoring parties or coalitions rather than to individual candidates, and it was common practice for the mandates to be assigned out of numerical order. Raguš could have been awarded a mandate despite her low position on the list, although she was not.)

She received the sixteenth position on the SRS's list in the 2007 parliamentary election and was this time included in her party's delegation when the list won eighty-one seats. Although the Radicals were the largest party in the parliament that followed, they fell well short of a majority and ultimately served in opposition. During her first term, Raguš served on the assembly's foreign affairs committee and the committee on environmental protection.

In the 2008 parliamentary election, Raguš was given the twentieth position on the SRS's list and received a mandate for a second term when the list won seventy-eight seats. The overall results of the election were inconclusive, but a coalition government was ultimately formed by the For a European Serbia (Za evropsku Srbiju, ZES) alliance and the Socialist Party of Serbia (Socijalistička partija Srbije, SPS), and the Radicals remained in opposition. Raguš also appeared in the lead position on the SRS's list for Voždovac in the 2008 Serbian local elections, which were held concurrently with the parliamentary vote. ZES won the election, with twenty-four seats against seventeen for the Radicals, and Raguš did not afterward take a seat in the local assembly. In the republican parliament, she served on the foreign affairs committee and the committee for development and international economic relations. She was also a member of SRS leader Vojislav Šešelj's defence committee at the International Criminal Tribunal for the former Yugoslavia (ICTY) in The Hague during this time. 

The Radical Party experienced a serious split in late 2008, with several members joining the more moderate Serbian Progressive Party (Srpska napredna stranka, SNS) under the leadership of Tomislav Nikolić and Aleksandar Vučić. Raguš remained with the Radicals. Her public profile was unexpectedly increased in 2009, when she was the only Radical Party delegate not expelled from a particular session of the Serbian parliament. Her performance in the assembly received a favourable response from the media, including from sources not normally inclined to support the Radicals. 

Raguš was considered a rising star in the SRS during this time, but she did not remain at the forefront of the party for long. The government that was formed in Voždovac after the 2008 local elections proved unstable, and a new local election was called for June 2009. Raguš again led the Radical list. Weakened by the previous year's split, the party fell to only three mandates. This time, she took a seat in the local assembly. Post-election negotiations for a municipal government were not successful, and yet another local election was held in December 2009. In this campaign, Raguš appeared in the second position on the SRS list. The party continued to lose support, and the list fell below the electoral threshold for representation in the assembly. Raguš began withdrawing from party activities after this time, amid rumours that she was unhappy with the party's strategy in the local campaigns.

She did not appear on the SRS list for the 2012 Serbian parliamentary election, and her term in parliament ended that year. After the election, she said that she was no longer a member of any party. There were rumours that she would cross to the Progressives at this time, in conjunction with fellow disillusioned Radical Aleksandar Martinović, but this did not occur.

Return to political life (2020–present)
After eight years out of political life, Raguš contested the 2020 Serbian parliamentary election on the electoral list of Aleksandar Šapić's Serbian Patriotic Alliance, appearing in the second list position as a non-party candidate. The list won eleven seats, and she returned to parliament for a third term. (Serbia's electoral laws had been reformed in 2011, such that mandates were awarded in numerical order to candidates on successful lists.) She was chosen afterwards as the leader of the SPAS parliamentary group.

In May 2021, the Serbian Patriotic Alliance was merged into the Progressive Party. Raguš became a member of the SNS and was elected to the party's presidency later in the year. In the 2020–22 parliament, she was a member of the committee on administrative, budgetary, mandate, and immunity issues; a deputy member of the committee on education, science, technological development, and the information society, the chair of a subcommittee on the information society and digitalization, and a member of Serbia's delegation to the Parliamentary Assembly of the Black Sea Economic Cooperation.

Raguš was given the eighty-sixth position on the Progressive Party's Together We Can Do Everything list in the 2022 parliamentary election and was re-elected when the list won a plurality victory with 120 out of 250 mandates. After the election, she was chosen as deputy leader of the SNS assembly group. She is a member of the foreign affairs committee, a deputy member of the European integration committee, and a deputy member of the European Union–Serbia stabilization and association committee.

In May 2022, Vojislav Šešelj received a summons to appear before the International Residual Mechanism for Criminal Tribunals (the successor body to the ICTY) to respond to charges concerning the publication of classified information and the names of protected witnesses. The summons also included the names of seven current and former Radical Party officials, including Raguš.

Electoral record

Local (City of Belgrade)

References

1969 births
Living people
Politicians from Belgrade
Members of the National Assembly (Serbia)
Members of the Parliamentary Assembly of the Black Sea Economic Cooperation
Serbian Radical Party politicians
Serbian Progressive Party politicians